Sand & Snow is a studio album by British alternative band A Silent Film, released on June 5, 2012.

Track listing

Personnel

A Silent Film
Robert Stevenson - piano, vocals
Karl Bareham - guitar
Ali Hussain - bass
Spencer Walker - drums

Additional personnel
Jessica Cox, Amy Stanford, Laura Stanford, and Rosie Tompsett - strings on "Reaching the Potential," "Danny, Dakota & the Wishing Well" and "Anastasia"
John Catlin - engineering
Charles Godfrey - engineering
Darius Deezle Harrison - additional production
Scott Knapper - engineering
Catherine Marks - mixing
Alan Moulder - mixing
Felix Rashman - engineering
Justin Salter - engineering
Phil Schlemmer - engineering

References

2012 albums
A Silent Film albums